The 1924 United States presidential election in Oklahoma took place on November 4, 1924, as part of the 1924 United States presidential election which was held throughout all contemporary forty-eight states. Voters chose ten representatives, or electors to the Electoral College, who voted for president and vice president.

Background and vote
In its early years, Oklahoma was a “Solid South” state whose founding fathers like "Alfalfa Bill" Murray and Charles N. Haskell had disfranchised most of its black population via literacy tests and grandfather clauses, the latter of which would be declared unconstitutional in Guinn v. United States. In 1920 this “Solid South” state, nonetheless, joined the Republican landslide of Warren G. Harding, electing a GOP senator and five congressmen, but in 1922 the Democratic Party returned to their typical ascendancy as the state GOP became bitterly divided.

Also in the running was the Progressive Party nominee, Senator Robert M. La Follette of Wisconsin and his running mate Senator Burton K. Wheeler of Montana, though they ran under the Farmer-Labor Party label in Oklahoma. Despite problems in the state's agricultural sector, La Follette did not have the appeal in Oklahoma he had in more northerly areas of the Plains. Isolationism was weaker in this heavily Southern, Protestant state and Bryan-era pietist Democratic support struck a different cultural vein from La Follette's largely Catholic and Lutheran backers. Unlike the Bryanites, La Follette's base strongly opposed the Ku Klux Klan, which dominated politics in Oklahoma at the time, and was focused on farm cooperatives.

Oklahoma was won by Democratic nominee, Ambassador John W. Davis of West Virginia, over Republican nominee, incumbent President Calvin Coolidge of Massachusetts. Davis ran with Governor Charles W. Bryan of Nebraska, while Coolidge ran with former Budget Director Charles G. Dawes of Illinois. Davis won the state by a margin of 5.59 percentage points. This made Oklahoma the only state outside the former Confederacy to vote for him. This is also the last time Oklahoma would vote for a losing Democratic candidate, and just one of two times (the other being its first election in 1908) overall.

Results

Results by county

Notes

References

Oklahoma
1924
1924 Oklahoma elections